was a Japanese author. His best known work is the Shin Kabuki play Bancho Sarayashiki.

Kido was born in the district of Shiba Takanawa, a neighbourhood in Minato Ward, Tōkyō

Family
Kido’s father, Okamoto Keinosuke  (岡本佳之助) (later Kiyoshi - 清), was a samurai who, after the Meiji Restoration left the service of the Tokugawa Shōgunate and went to work for the British Legation as an interpreter. He was good friends with Ichikawa Danjūrō IX (九代目市川團十 - Kudaime Ichikawa Danjūrō), Konakamura Kiyonori (小中村清矩), Kawanobe Mitate   (川辺御楯) and Kurokawa Mayori (黒川真頼) who together formed the Antiquarian Society (Kyūko Kai - 求古会) to promote the modernisation of Kabuki based on the doctrine of the Theatre Reform Movement (Engeki Kairyō Kai  - 演劇改良運動). He was also friends with Morita Kan’ya XII (十二代目守田勘弥) the owner-manager (zamoto -座元) of the Shintomiza Theatre, an employee of the British Legation and avid Kabuki fan Thomas Russell Hillier McClatchie, and an Austro-Hungarian diplomat Heinrich von Siebold.

Life
With the relocation of the British Legation to Kōjimachi District in 1873 Kido’s father moved there with his wife and daughter. Kido was born there, at Nigō Hanzaka (二合半坂), Iitachō (飯田町) in Kōjimachi District (麹町区). Later they moved to Motozono-chō (元園町) in Kōjimachi. Kido learnt Tokiwazu(常磐津) from the daughter of a local hairdresser and Nagauta(長唄) by listening to his older sister’s lessons. Early on, when he was too young to go the Kabuki, he was left at home in the care of two maids and would listen to the gossip of his mother and older sister about the performances when they returned home. As he got older he went to the Kabuki with his family when the family would socialise at the Kikuoka (菊岡) tea house (chaya - 茶屋) in the Shintomiza Theatre’s(新富座) enclosure (undōjō -運動場). During his early attendances at the Kabuki he took a dislike to Danjūrō IX after witnessing, according to Kido, his childish behaviour during an incident backstage but later became an ardent fan.

He would listen to foreign ghost stories told to him by his uncle who brought them back from his overseas travels. He was especially enamoured of ‘Windsor Castle’ by William Harrison Ainsworth which he mistook for Hamlet. At the age of 16 he knew William George Aston, the Secretary of the British Legation, whose children he babysat and from whom he was taught about Shakespeare, a process which Kido said taught him some of the techniques of play-writing.  Much to Kido's delight Aston later helped him find the scripts for Kawatake Mokuami's plays 'Nakamitsu', 'Shisenryō Koban Umenoha ', and 'Kagatobi' which had been published by the Ginza-based Kabuki Shinpō  (Kabuki News) Company. He learnt Chinese poetry from his father and English from his uncle, and students at the British Legation. He attended and graduated from Tōkyō First Junior High School (Tōkyō Furitsu Daiichi Chūgakkō - 東京府立第一中学校) afterwards attempting to become a playwright but when that failed from 1890 he wrote stage reviews for the newspaper Tōkyō Nichi Nichi Shimbun (東京日日新聞 Tōkyō Nichi Nichi Shinbun, lit."Tokyo Daily News"), now the Mainichi Shimbun when he used the pseudonym Kyokido, which he later changed to Kido. He went to work for Chūō Shimbun spending 24 years as a newspaper reporter, including a period in Manchuria. He bought the contract of and married a Yoshiwara Geisha from the Uwajima feudal domain called Kojima Sakae (小島栄). Success eluded him until in 1911, his popular play 'The Mask maker's Story' (Shuzenji Monogatari - 修善寺物語) premiered at the Meijiza. In 1916 his Shin (new) Kabuki play 'Story of a Broken Dish at Bancho' (Bancho Sarayashiki - 番町皿屋敷) was staged at the Hongōza Theatre (本郷座). Between 1917 and 1937 ‘The Curious Casebook of Inspector Hanshichi’ (Hanshichi Torimonocho - 半七捕物帳) was serialised. His series on the theatre of the Meiji period, a valuable resource, the first half of which was serialised in the Monthly Kabuki Review Magazine in the late 1920s, early 1930s as 'Stories of the Past' (Sugi ni shi Monogatari - 過ぎにし物語), then again as a series in 1935 and finally in full as 'On the Theatre of the Meiji Period - Under the Lamp' (Meiji Gekidan Ranpu no Moto ni te - 明治劇談ランプの下にて) by Iwanami Shoten in 1993.

In 1918 he visited the US and Europe. His home and library in Kōjimachi were destroyed in the Great earthquake of 1923. He was taken in by his disciple Nukata Roppuku(額田六福) from where he moved to Azabu (麻布) in Minato City (Minato ku - 港区). The following year he moved to Hyakuni chō (百人町) a street in north Shinjuku (Shinjuku ku - 新宿区). From 1935 his articles were occasionally published in Sande Mainichi (Every Sunday - サンデー毎日). His last novel was the controversial Tiger (Tora - 虎) published in 1937 about two brothers running a freak show which is in trouble who hit the jackpot when they get a Tiger cub. He continued to publish plays in the “Stage” magazine (“Butai” - 舞台) from 1930 until 1938. In 1939 he died of pneumonia and is buried with his wife in Aoyama cemetery (Aoyama Reien - 青山霊園) in Minami Aoyama

After his death one of his students and adoptive heir, his son Okamoto Kyōichi (岡本経一) 1909 -2010, founded the Okamoto Kido Journal which printed much of Kido’s work. Kido’s grandson Okamoto Shuichi (岡本修一) is the current President. The Okamoto Kido Literary Prize, The Okamoto Kido Award (Okamoto Kido Juyo - 岡本綺堂授与)/', was established but was only awarded twice between 1943 and 1944 during the period leading up to the end of the Second World War.

References 
 
  (French)
  (French)

External links 

 
 
 J'Lit | Authors : Kido Okamoto | Books from Japan
 e-texts of Kido's works at Aozora bunko
  English translation of 明治劇談ランプの下にて, Meiji Gekidan Ranpu no Moto ni te, Talks on Meiji Era Theatre:Under the Lamp
 Okamoto Kido Project
 Prominent people of Minato City
 
 Okamoto Kido at Kabuki 21

1872 births
1939 deaths
Japanese writers
Japanese mystery writers
War correspondents of the Russo-Japanese War
Deaths from pneumonia in Japan